The yellow-throated bush tanager (Chlorospingus flavigularis) is a species of bird traditionally placed in the family Thraupidae, but now closer to Arremonops in the Passerellidae. It is found in Bolivia, Colombia, Ecuador, Panama, and Peru.

Its natural habitats are subtropical or tropical moist montane forests and heavily degraded former forest.

References

yellow-throated bush-tanager
Birds of the Northern Andes
yellow-throated bush tanager
yellow-throated bush tanager
Taxonomy articles created by Polbot